The Mormon History Association (MHA) is an independent, non-profit organization dedicated to the study and understanding of all aspects of Mormon history to promote understanding, scholarly research, and publication in the field. MHA was founded in December 1965 at the American Historical Association (AHA) meeting in San Francisco under the leadership of Latter-day Saint and historian Leonard J. Arrington. In 1972, MHA became an independent organization with its own annual conferences and publications. The Journal of Mormon History, the official biennial publication of the association, began publication in 1974. MHA also publishes the quarterly Mormon History Newsletter and is an affiliate of both AHA and the Western History Association.

MHA "welcome[s] all who are interested in the Mormon past, irrespective of religious affiliation, academic training, or world location." It is not affiliated with the LDS Church and was founded by people who support no religious beliefs. Its members are composed of people both within and without the Church of Jesus Christ of Latter-day Saints (LDS Church) and the Community of Christ, including those who reject Mormonism.

Presidents
MHA presidents are recognized contributors to the field of Mormon history and serve for one year.

Journal of Mormon History

Since 1974, MHA has produced the Journal of Mormon History, an academic journal in the field of Mormon studies. From the founding of MHA until 1974, Dialogue: A Journal of Mormon Thought was a principal venue for articles on Mormon History written by MHA members.

A DVD archive of past issues of the journal is available at MHA's web site.

List of editors

Mormon History Association Awards 
Among the awards presented by the association are: the Leonard J. Arrington Award "for distinguished and meritorious service to Mormon history" – named for the MHA's founder, and father of New Mormon history; Best Book Award; Best First Book;  Best Documentary or Bibliography; Best Biography; an award for an outstanding International Mormon history; an award for an outstanding history of a Mormon family (or grouping of families in one community).

References

External links
 Official website (new)
 DigitalCommons.USU.edu/MormonHistory
 Official website (old)
 Awards given by the MHA
 Digitized archive of the Journal of Mormon History

1965 establishments in California
Mormon History Association
Historical societies in Utah
History organizations based in the United States
Latter Day Saint organizations
Mormon studies
Organizations based in Utah
Organizations established in 1965
Non-profit organizations based in Utah